Hinea fasciata is a species of sea snail, a marine gastropod mollusk in the family Planaxidae

Distribution
This marine species occurs off the coast of South Africa and the Tuamotu Islands.

References

 Kilburn, R.N. & Rippey, E. (1982) Sea Shells of Southern Africa. Macmillan South Africa, Johannesburg, xi + 249 pp. page(s): 53
 Sheppard, A (1984). The molluscan fauna of Chagos (Indian Ocean) and an analysis of its broad distribution patterns. Coral Reefs 3: 43–50
 Steyn, D.G. & Lussi, M. (1998) Marine Shells of South Africa. An Illustrated Collector’s Guide to Beached Shells. Ekogilde Publishers, Hartebeespoort, South Africa, ii + 264 pp. page(s): 36
 Hasegawa K. (2017). Family Planaxidae. Pp. 794-795, in: T. Okutani (ed.), Marine Mollusks in Japan, ed. 2. 2 vols. Tokai University Press. 1375 pp.

External links
 Pease W.H. (1868). Descriptions of marine Gasteropodæ inhabiting Polynesia. American Journal of Conchology. 4(2): 71-80, pls 8-9

Planaxidae
Gastropods described in 1868